Finley Township may refer to the following townships in the United States:

 Finley Township, Scott County, Indiana
 Finley Township, Steele County, North Dakota
 Finley Township, Decatur County, Kansas
 Finley Township, Webster County, Missouri

See also 
 East Finley Township, Washington County, Pennsylvania
 West Finley Township, Washington County, Pennsylvania